Zaib Rehman is a Pakistani lawyer and actress. She started in television in her 20s and made her movie debut in the 2011 blockbuster Bol.

Early life 
During her time as student at Lahore College for Women University, she acted as President of the Dramatic Society and completed a National Guard training. She achieved many prizes in inter-college debating competitions. In 1975, she also performed in the annual production of the play Phandy.

Career 
In her early 20s, Zaib Rehman started to perform in PTV classics like Ragon Mein Andhera (which turned into the series Andhera Ujala), Shikayatein Hikayatein and Inn Se Miliye. She also acted in the popular PTV series Fard-e-Jurm and Hazaaron Raastey and starred in one of the most famous series of individual plays: Andhera Ujala. She later appeared in surrealistic plays like Chamkee, Se Semar, Waqt-e-waqt, Mehar O Jena, Aasaib, Roma, Haar and Seraab Parast of the series Nigar Khana. PTV's prominent hit Pehli Si Muhabbat was her final TV performance.

After a long family-related hiatus, Zaib Rehman made her movie debut in 2011, portraying a suffering mother in Shoaib Mansoor's Pakistani hit movie Bol. Critics describe her performance as "outstanding", "compelling" and "most effective". In April 2014, she shot scenes for Farouq Mengal's Pakistani movie Hijrat in Istanbul, Turkey, with Asad Zaman, Rabia Butt, Jamal Shah and Durdana Butt.

In November 2016, she returned to television. She co-stars in the Geo TV serial drama Mannat, playing the role of Meera Maa.

Filmography

Television 
 Mannat (2016–17)
 Piyari Bittu (2017–18)
 Qurban (2018)
 Ranjha Ranjha Kardi (2018)
 Aangan (2018)
 Qissa Meherbano Ka (2021)

Additional activities 

Zaib Rehman holds the following degrees:
 Bachelor of Arts and Bachelor of Laws (University of the Punjab)
 D.T.L. (Diploma in Taxation Law)

She currently practices law in Lahore High Court and is providing free legal aid to deserving prisoners. In April 2014, Zaib Rehman - chairwoman of the Lahore High Court Women Prisons Committee - paid for air tickets for two Tanzanians forgotten in Central Jail Lahore (Kot Lakhpat) for two years. The Tanzanians, Umar Ali Suleiman and Muhammad Ashraf Zakki, were jailed for overstay in Pakistan. They returned to their home country on May 7, 2014.

She frequently holds lectures on social topics in different colleges, e. g. at Lahore University of Management Sciences' Feminist Society (FemSoc). In March 2014, she received the Distinguished Alumni Award at Lahore College for Women University.

References

External links 
 

Lollywood
Pakistani child actresses
Pakistani television actresses
Punjabi people
University of the Punjab alumni
Living people
Actresses from Lahore
Lahore College for Women University alumni
1959 births